Allan Zullo (born November 23, 1947) is an American non-fiction writer. He is the author or co-author of more than 120 paperbacks for adults and younger readers on a broad range of subjects for general audiences.

A native of Rockford, Illinois, Zullo graduated from Northern Illinois University in 1969 with a degree in journalism.  His books include The Baseball Hall of Shame and Baseball Confidential (both co-written with Bruce Nash), A Boomer's Guide to Grandparenting (co-written with his wife Kathryn),  and the Haunted Kids series.  His syndicated comic strip The Ghost Story Club ran in American newspapers from 1995 to 1998.

Bibliography

 Police Heroess: Young Survivors of the Holocaust 
 We Fought Back: Teen Resisters of the Holocaust 
 Escape: Children of the Holocaust
 Heroes of the Holocaust: True Stories of Rescues by Teens
 Survivors: True Stories of Children in the Holocaust
 Bad Pets series
 Bad Pets: Bad to the Bone
 Bad Pets Hall of Shame
 Bad Pets on the Loose!
 Bad Pets: Most Wanted
 Bad Pets: True Tales of Misbehaving Animals
 Bad Pets Save Christmas
 Haunted Kids series
 Haunted Kids: True Ghost Stories
 More Haunted Kids
 Totally Haunted Kids
 Haunted Campers
 Haunted Schools
 Haunted Teachers
 Haunted Animals
 The Haunted Graveyard
 Haunted Baby-Sitters
 The Haunted Shortstop
 Haunted Athletes
 America's Most Haunted: True Scary Creatures
 America's Most Haunted: True Scary Places
 We're Here: True Tales of Alien Encounters
 Weird But True Tales
 Animal Books
 The Dog Who Saved Christmas
 The Dog Who Saved Halloween
 Christmas Miracle Pets
 Miracle Pets: True Tales of Courage and Survival
 True Tales of Animal Heroes
 Incredible Dogs and Their Incredible Tales
 Partial List of Other Books
 World's Dumbest Crooks
 World's Dumbest Crooks 2
 Fact or Fake
 Butter My Butt and Call Me a Biscuit
 You're the Butter on My Biscuit
 Golf Is a Funny Game
 Amazing But True Golf Facts
 March Madness
 The Hero Inside of You
 The Baseball Hall of Shame: The Best of Blooperstown (co-written with Bruce Nash)
 The Baseball Hall of Shame (co-written with Bruce Nash)
 A Boomer's Guide to Grandparenting (co-written with his wife Kathryn)

References

External links

Allan Zullo's website

1947 births
Living people
Northern Illinois University alumni
American fortean writers
Writers from Rockford, Illinois
Sportswriters from Illinois